Vagococcus humatus is a Gram-positive, coccus-shaped and non-motile bacterium from the genus of Vagococcus.

References 

Lactobacillales
Bacteria described in 2017